The 1998 Hammersmith and Fulham Council election took place on 7 May 1998 to elect members of Hammersmith and Fulham London Borough Council in London, England. The whole council was up for election and the Labour party stayed in overall control of the council.

Background

Election result
The Labour Party won 36 seats (on a 49.7% share of the vote) - a gain of 3 seats from the previous election, and maintained control of the council.
The Conservative Party won 14 seats (with 37.4% of the vote) - a loss of 1 seat from their previous result.
The Liberal Democrats lost the two seats they previously held, winning 12.6% of the votes cast.

Ward results

Addison

Avonmore

Broadway

Brook Green

Colehill

College Park & Old Oak

Coningham

Crabtree

Eel Brook

Gibbs Green

Grove

Margravine

Normand

Palace

Ravenscourt

Sands End

Sherbrooke

Starch Green

Sulivan

Town

Walham

White City & Shepherds Bush

Wormholt

References

1998
1998 London Borough council elections
20th century in the London Borough of Hammersmith and Fulham